Georgia's 107th House District elects one member of the Georgia House of Representatives. This district covers a portion of the northeast metropolitan Atlanta area, covering parts of Snellville and Lawrenceville in Gwinnett County. 
Its current representative is Democrat Shelly Hutchinson. In the 2018 Midterm elections, Democrat Shelly Hutchinson defeated Republican Janet Mihochi, and became the district's next representative in January 2019. She is the first Democrat to lead the district in recent years.

Elected representatives

References

Georgia House of Representatives districts
Gwinnett County, Georgia